The Zeeheldenbuurt is a neighbourhood of Amsterdam, Netherlands. Located in the borough Amsterdam-West, it borders directly on the Westelijke Eilanden to the west. It lies between the Westerkanaal and the Westerdok; to the north is Houthaven and the IJ. The neighbourhood is served by the S100 road, and is sometimes confused with the nearby Admiralenbuurt.

References
 Westerpark, Barren, Sparren en Koperen Knopen. De geschiedenis van stadsdeel Westerpark: Zeehelden-, Spaarndammer-, Staatslieden- en Hugo de Grootbuurt. Door Ton Heijdra, Uitgeverij René de Milliano, Alkmaar 2007. .
 De moord-en-brandbuurt, de Amsterdamse Spaarndammer- en Zeeheldenbuurt tussen 1930 en 1960. Door Harry Stork, Uitgeverij Duizend & Een, 2007. .
 A. Huyser: Het eerste Amsterdamse Parkje, in Ons Amsterdam 1991 no. 7/8, pages 194–196.

Amsterdam-West
Neighbourhoods of Amsterdam